Craig Christopher Crenshaw (born 1962) is a retired American military officer who has been tapped by Glenn Youngkin to serve as Virginia Secretary of Veterans and Defense Affairs.

References

External links
Virginia Secretary of Veterans Affairs

Living people
1962 births
State cabinet secretaries of Virginia
African-American people in Virginia politics
Military personnel from Virginia
Military personnel from Florida
People from Pensacola, Florida
United States Marine Corps generals